Aglen Point is a rocky point forming the west side of the entrance to Richards Cove on the north coast of Ray Promontory in the northwestern part of Byers Peninsula on Livingston Island in the South Shetland Islands, Antarctica.  Situated 470 m west of Voyteh Point and 1.6 km east of Essex Point.  The area was visited by early 19th century sealers.

The feature is part of the Antarctic Specially Protected Area ASPA 126 Byers Peninsula, situated in one of its restricted zones.

The point is named after the settlement of Aglen in northern Bulgaria.

Location
British mapping in 1968, Spanish in 1993 and Bulgarian in 2005 and 2009.

Maps
 Península Byers, Isla Livingston. Mapa topográfico a escala 1:25000. Madrid: Servicio Geográfico del Ejército, 1992.
 L.L. Ivanov. Antarctica: Livingston Island and Greenwich, Robert, Snow and Smith Islands. Scale 1:120000 topographic map.  Troyan: Manfred Wörner Foundation, 2009.  
 Antarctic Digital Database (ADD). Scale 1:250000 topographic map of Antarctica. Scientific Committee on Antarctic Research (SCAR). Since 1993, regularly upgraded and updated.
 L.L. Ivanov. Antarctica: Livingston Island and Smith Island. Scale 1:100000 topographic map. Manfred Wörner Foundation, 2017.

Notes

References
 Aglen Point. SCAR Composite Gazetteer of Antarctica.
 Bulgarian Antarctic Gazetteer. Antarctic Place-names Commission. (details in Bulgarian, basic data in English)

External links
 Aglen Point. Copernix satellite image

Headlands of Livingston Island
Bulgaria and the Antarctic